Mortacci is a 1989 Italian dark comedy film directed by Sergio Citti.

Plot summary 
In a small town cemetery, the deceased every night host a meeting. They are doomed not to enter the next stage of the afterlife, till the last living human who remembers them passes away. Through the recollection of their lives and deaths, the different characters are introduced: Alma, a theater actress (Carol Alt) who witnesses every night the futile attempt of her ex lover (Malcolm McDowell) to commit suicide over her grave; Angelo, a womanizer (Andy Luotto) who died out of shame; Felice and Giggetto, two beggars (Eraldo Turra and Luciano Manzalini) who soon leave the group as the last woman (Mariangela Melato) who remembers them dies while visiting their grave. The narration is interrupted by the arrival of Lucillo (Sergio Rubini), a soldier who was presumed dead in a military mission in Lebanon and who is forced by his fellow villagers to die for real, as they built a huge business on his hero status and fame. The cemetery warden Domenico (Vittorio Gassman) supervises all the operations, from opening the gates to stealing valuables from the dead, without knowing that the deceased see him and everything that happens in the small cemetery.

Cast 
 Vittorio Gassman as Domenico 
 Carol Alt as Alma Rossetti
 Malcolm McDowell as Edmondo
 Galeazzo Benti as Tommaso Grillo 
 Mariangela Melato as Jolanda 
 Sergio Rubini as Lucillo Cardellini 
 Nino Frassica as La guida 
 Andy Luotto as Angelo Cuoco, aka "Scopone" 
 Aldo Giuffré as the undertaker
 Alvaro Vitali as Torquato
 Silvana Bosi as Torquato's mother
 Eraldo Turra as Felice 
 Luciano Manzalini as Giggetto 
 Donald O'Brien as Archibald Williams 
 Michela Miti as the bartender
 Gina Rovere as Ada

References

External links

1989 films
1980s black comedy films
Films directed by Sergio Citti
Films scored by Francesco De Masi
Italian black comedy films
Films with screenplays by Vincenzo Cerami
1989 comedy films
1980s Italian-language films
1980s Italian films